Encyclopædia Britannica Films was an educational film production company in the 20th century owned by Encyclopædia Britannica Inc.

See also Encyclopædia Britannica Films and the animated 1990 television series Britannica's Tales Around the World.

A

B

C

D

E

F

G

H

I

J

K

L

M

N

O

P

Q

R

S

T

U

V

W

X

Y

Z

External links 

Encyclopædia Britannica Films
Encyclopædia Britannica

References 
 Catalog of Copyright Entries: Third Series Volume 24, Parts 12-13, Number 1: Motion Pictures and Filmstrips 1970 Library of Congress 
 Catalog of Copyright Entries: Third Series Volume 25, Parts 12–13, Number 1: Motion Pictures and Filmstrips 1971 Library of Congress 
 Catalog of Copyright Entries: Third Series Volume 27, Parts 12–13, Number 1: Motion Pictures 1973 Library of Congress 
 Catalog of Copyright Entries: Third Series Volume 28, Parts 12–13, Number 1: Motion Pictures 1974 Library of Congress 
 Catalog of Copyright Entries: Third Series Volume 29, Parts 12–13, Number 1: Motion Pictures 1975 Library of Congress 
 Catalog of Copyright Entries: Third Series Volume 30, Parts 12–13, Number 1: Motion Pictures 1976 Library of Congress 
 Catalog of Copyright Entries: Third Series Volume 31, Parts 12–13, Number 1: Motion Pictures 1977 Library of Congress 
 Catalog of Copyright Entries: Fourth Series Volume 31, Part 4: Motion Pictures & Filmstrips 1980 Library of Congress 
 Educational Film Guide 1947 H. W. Wilson Company 
 Educational Film Guide 1959 Annual Supplement 1959 H. W. Wilson Company 
 Motion Pictures 1912–1939 Catalog of Copyright Entries 1951 Library of Congress 
 Motion Pictures 1940–1949 Catalog of Copyright Entries 1953 Library of Congress 
 Motion Pictures 1950–1959 Catalog of Copyright Entries 1960 Library of Congress 
 Motion Pictures 1960–1969 Catalog of Copyright Entries 1971 Library of Congress